The 1994 New Mexico gubernatorial election was held on November 8, 1994, for the four-year term beginning on January 1, 1995. Candidates for governor and lieutenant governor ran on a ticket as running mates.

Incumbent Democrat Bruce King ran for a fourth term with Patricia Madrid as a running mate, losing to Republican nominees Gary Johnson, a businessman, and Walter Bradley, a former state senator. Former Lieutenant Governor Roberto Mondragón ran with Steven Schmidt as the nominees of the Green Party, receiving 10.4 percent of the vote.

The election was marked by the surprising rise of Republican Gary Johnson, the 41-year-old owner of one of the state's largest construction companies. Johnson, who had never before held elected office, upset a crowded Republican primary field by a margin of fewer than 1,300 votes. With the state's non-Republicans split between the centrist King and progressive Mondragón, King failed to gain a majority and Johnson won the election with 49.8% of the vote. This is the last time a governor of New Mexico lost re-election.

Democratic Party
King faced a tough renomination campaign, being challenged by incumbent Lieutenant Governor Casey Luna, who had a falling out with King in 1993 over King's refusal to give Luna a larger role in King's administration. Former New Mexico Commissioner of Public Lands Jim Baca also challenged King.

Candidates
 Jim Baca, former Director of the U.S. Bureau of Land Management and former New Mexico Commissioner of Public Lands
 Bruce King, incumbent Governor
 Casey Luna, incumbent Lieutenant Governor

Primary Results

Republican Party

Candidates
 David F. Cargo, former Governor and former State Representative
 Dick Cheney, State Representative
 John Dendahl, former New Mexico Secretary of Economic Development and Tourism
 Gary Johnson, businessman

Primary Results

Green Party

Candidates
 Roberto Mondragón, former Lieutenant Governor

Polling

Campaign
Bruce King, the Democratic three-term incumbent, began the general election with the most funding and name recognition. King was a career politician who had first been elected to the Santa Fe County Commission in 1954, when Gary Johnson was just one year old. King also had the support of the Gold Boot Club, a business-backed political coalition that channeled thousands of dollars to his campaign.

King's quest for an unprecedented fourth term faced obstacles from the left and the right. From the left, King was challenged by Green Party nominee Roberto Mondragón. Mondragón was a populist former Democrat, who had served as Lieutenant Governor from 1971 to 1975 and in the state House from 1979 to 1983. Mondragón had a knack for appealing to both progressive whites and working-class Hispanics, and attacked King for his cushy relationships with big business.

Gary Johnson was the nominee of New Mexico's Republican Party, a statewide party that had won just one gubernatorial election since 1970. Johnson faced the challenge of keeping together his Republican base while appealing to independents and Democrats frustrated with King. Johnson campaigned as a political outsider and self-made entrepreneur. In college, Johnson had worked as a door-to-door handyman, a business that gradually expanded into Big J Enterprises. By 1999, the company employed over 1,000 people and was worth several million dollars. Johnson avoided then-divisive social issues like abortion and gay rights, and focused his campaign on pocketbook issues like taxes and the state budget. Johnson touted his experience in the business world of balancing budgets while growing his company, and promised to bring that experience to state government.

In November, Gary Johnson won the election with just under 50% of the vote, while King got almost 40% and Mondragón pulled in just over 10%.

Election results

References

See also

Governor
1994
New Mexico
Gary Johnson